Television Hawke's Bay (TVHB) is a regional television station based in Napier, Hawke's Bay, New Zealand.

TVHB is operated by Sawyer Television Ltd which also runs a news and current affairs bureau in Napier, makes TV commercials and is a provider of various services to broadcasting agencies.

TVHB is now broadcasting on virtual channel 48 via DVB-T in the Hawke's Bay.

External links
 TVHB website

Television stations in New Zealand
Mass media in Napier, New Zealand